The ISIS Hunters are a special forces unit of the Syrian army, formed in 2017 during the Syrian civil war.

History 
The ISIS Hunters were formed in early 2017 after the Syrian regime forces were routed in the December 2016 battle of Palmyra. The group's fighters are integrated into the 5th Army Corps, a formation formed in November 2016 with Russian support, composed entirely of volunteers.

Russia's goal in forming the ISIS Hunters is to build forces that can serve as a counterweight to Iran in Syria, as their objectives in the region differ from those of Moscow. The training of the ISIS Hunters is supervised by the Russians, particularly by the private military company Wagner Group, and their weapons and equipment are also supplied by Russia.

Personnel 
The group's strength is probably a few dozen men; some of its fighters in propaganda videos appear to be particularly old.

Areas of operation 
In early 2017, the ISIS Hunters were operating in the Palmyra area, where they were responsible for protecting the military airport, as well as gas and oil fields.

In February 2018, the ISIS Hunters were engaged in the Battle of Khasham near Deir ez-Zor against the Syrian Democratic Forces. During this battle, they were subjected to U.S. bombing, resulting in the loss of twenty of their men. Following this incident, the group issued a statement about the casualties they suffered during the fighting.

References 

 
Syrian civil war